Caloplaca haematites is a species of lichen belonging to the family Teloschistaceae. It has mainly been reported from Europe but is also found in other parts of the world. 

Caloplaca haematites grows as an epiphyte on trees. A study on Kos Island reported Caloplaca haematites from the trunks of Melia azedarach and Robinia pseudacacia trees where it grows along other the other lichens Catillaria nigroclavata, Rinodina colobina and Rinodina exigua.

See also
 List of Caloplaca species

References

Lecanoromycetes
Lichens of Europe
Lichen species
Lichens described in 1862